Threesome, is a 2018 legal comedy drama produced by TVB. It stars Mandy Wong, Benjamin Yuen and Jason Chan as the main cast, with Arnold Kwok, Snow Suen,  Joseph Lee, Gigi Wong, Lam King-ching and Kirby Lam as the major supporting cast.

The drama earned critical acclaim and won My Favourite TV Drama in both Malaysia and Singapore in 2018 TVB 51st Anniversary Gala.  Mandy Wong earned critical acclaim for her performance in the drama, playing Evie Fong Yee-yan, a barrister with dissociative identity disorder, along with Evie's two other personalities, Piña Colada and Sau Mak Mak, winning Favourite TVB Actress in a Leading Role in both Malaysia and Singapore in 2018 TVB 51st Anniversary Gala.

Synopsis
Evie Fong Yee-yan (Mandy Wong) is a well-known barrister. In fact, she suffers from Dissociative Identity Disorder. Although Evie keeps this secret from everyone, Lee Tong-kai (Benjamin Yuen), Evie's childhood friend, finds out she suffers from DID by chance. In order to marry Theo Kei Hiu-yung (Jason Chan Chi-san), Evie accepts Kai as her apprentice and Kai must not reveal her secret to anyone.

Cast

Main cast

Major Supporting Cast
Arnold Kwok as Dominic Tong Mai-ni (唐米尼), a model. He got marry with Piña after they were drunk in Las Vegas.
Snow Suen as Dr. Bean Siu-dou (邊小豆), a psychotherapist who had a crush on Theo.
Joseph Lee as Au-yeung Yat-bor (歐陽一波), a prosecutor from the Deputy of Justice and Evie's master.
Gigi Wong as Easy Wah Yee-sze (華綺思), Evie's mother who treated her harshly.
Lam King-ching as Bowin Bak Bo-wun (白保運), Evie's apprentice.
Kirby Lam as Lee Tung-ling (利東伶), Kai's youngest sister.

Awards and nominations

TVB Anniversary Awards 2018

People's Choice Television Awards 2018

2018 Hong Kong Television Awards

References

2018 television films